NGC 301 is a spiral galaxy located approximately 204 million light-years from the Solar System in the constellation Cetus. It was discovered in 1886 by Frank Muller.

See also 
 List of NGC objects (1–1000)

References

External links 
 
 
 SEDS

0301
3345
?
Cetus (constellation)
Spiral galaxies